Brian Leigeb (born October 2, 1978) is a former professional American football defensive back. He played for the Indianapolis Colts in 2002. He is currently a college football assistant coach.

Early life and college
Leigeb was born on October 2, 1978 in Midland, Michigan. He played high school football at Herbert Henry Dow and college football at Central Michigan.

Professional career
In the 2002 NFL season, Leigeb played for the Indianapolis Colts. He appeared in 15 games, recording 11 total tackles, including two tackles for loss.

Coaching career
Since 2011, Leigeb has served as the defensive backs coach for the football team at Northwood Timberwolves.

References

1978 births
Living people
American football defensive backs
Central Michigan Chippewas football players
Indianapolis Colts players